Area code 773 serves Chicago, Illinois, outside the Loop and the innermost neighborhoods.

Originally, all of Chicago and its suburbs were in area code 312. Then, in 1989, area code 708 was created for the suburbs, leaving the city itself in area code 312.

By the mid-1990s, Chicago's continued growth and the proliferation of cell phones and pagers made it apparent that the city needed a new area code. It was decided to split off all of the city outside the downtown area as 773. The new area code went into effect on October 12, 1996. Permissive dialing of 312 continued across Chicago until January 11, 1997.  On August 10, 2007, the Illinois Commerce Commission announced that area code 872 would overlay area codes 312 and 773; it went into service on November 7, 2009.

The Illinois side of the Chicago area–312/773/872, 708, 847/224, 630/331 and portions of 815/779–is one of the largest local calling areas in the United States; with few exceptions, no long-distance charges are applied from one portion of the metro area to another.

References

External links
 Map of Illinois area codes by the North American Numbering Plan Administration
 List of exchanges in the 773 Area Code from AreaCodeDownload.com

773
Chicago
773